Gondwanaland is the third studio album by Australian ambient musical ensemble, Gondwanaland. It was released in 1987 and peaked at number 93 on the Kent Music Report.

At the ARIA Music Awards of 1988, the album won the ARIA Award for Best Indigenous Release.

Track listing
 All tracks written by Charlie McMahon, Eddy Duquemin & Peter Carolan.
 "Bedrock" - 6:16
 "Troppo (Dry) / Troppo (Wet)" - 7:13
 "Swamp" - 3:13
 "VJD - Communication" - 4:20
 "Hair of the Dog"	- 3:48
 "Rainforest" - 5:50
 "Landmark" - 5:52
 "Worlds End" - 4:20
 "Overland" - 3:42
 "Bullant" - 3:00

Charts

References 

1987 albums
ARIA Award-winning albums